David or Dave Ryan may refer to:

Sportspeople
 Dave Ryan (Australian footballer) (1885–1957), Australian rules footballer
 Dave Ryan (boxer) (born 1983), British boxer
 Dave Ryan (rugby union) (born 1986), Irish rugby union player
 David Ryan (footballer) (born 1957), English soccer player
 Dave Ryan (sportscaster) (born 1967), American play-by-play announcer
 Dave Ryan (American football) (1923–1988), American football quarterback

Others
 David Ryan (Medal of Honor) (1836–1896), Indian Wars Medal of Honor recipient
 Dave Ryan (comics) (born 1965), comic book painter known for his work on Forty-Five
 Dave Ryan (politician), mayor of Pickering, Ontario
 Dave Ryan (motorsport) (born 1954), former McLaren sporting director
 Dave "Chico" Ryan (1948–1998), musician
 Dave Ryan, morning host of KDWB-FM, Minneapolis, MN
 David Ryan, drummer with The Lemonheads
 David Ryan (born 1966), filmmaker, boat builder, captain, pilot, and local icon in Montauk, NY